John David Home Robertson (born 5 December 1948) is a retired Labour politician in Scotland.  He was a Member of Parliament (MP) for Berwick and East Lothian and East Lothian from 1978 to 2001 and a Member of the Scottish Parliament (MSP) for East Lothian from 1999 until 2007.

Background
John David Home Robertson was born at 18 Eglinton Crescent, Edinburgh, the son of John Wallace Robertson, Lieutenant-Colonel of the King's Own Scottish Borderers regiment, who assumed the additional surname in 1933, by Scottish Licence, of Home following his marriage that year to Helen Margaret (1905–1987), elder daughter and heiress of David William Milne-Home (1873–1918), of Wedderburn & Paxton, Berwickshire.

He was educated at Farleigh School, Ampleforth College and at the West of Scotland Agricultural College. In 1988, Home Robertson placed his maternal family's historic home and grounds, Paxton House, in a Historic Buildings Preservation Trust, and opened it to the public. It is a Partner Gallery of the National Galleries of Scotland.

Political career

He was an Independent member of Berwickshire District Council from 1974 to 1978, and of the Borders NHS Health Board 1975–78. One of his forebears was a Member of the (original) Parliament of Scotland, for Berwickshire, in 1707 who opposed the Act of Union.  

As a delegate to the Labour Party Conference in 1976, Home Robertson moved the resolution which committed the Party to devolution for Scotland, and throughout his career at Westminster he campaigned for the establishment of the Scottish Parliament. Home Robertson was the successful Labour candidate at the Berwick and East Lothian by-election in 1978, following the death of Labour MP John Mackintosh.

He represented Berwick and East Lothian until the 1983 general election, when the constituency was abolished and he was elected for the new constituency of East Lothian. He was re-elected at subsequent general elections before standing down at the 2001 election, when he was replaced by Anne Picking.

A Europhile, Home Robertson was one of only five Labour MPs to vote for the Third Reading of the Maastricht Treaty in 1993, defying his party Whip, which was to abstain.

At Westminster, Home Robertson served on the Scottish Affairs (1979–83) and Defence (1990–) Select committees, and was Chairman of the Scottish Group of Labour M.P.s, 1982–83. He spent time as Opposition Scottish Whip, 1983–84, as Labour's Opposition Front Bench Spokesman on: Agriculture (1984–87), Scottish Affairs (1987–88), Agricultural and Rural Affairs (1988–), and Food (1989–). 

He was Parliamentary Private Secretary to Jack Cunningham at the Ministry of Agriculture and then at the Cabinet Office. He announced that would stand down from the Scottish Parliament in 2007, and was succeeded by Iain Gray.

References

External links
 
 

1948 births
Living people
Politicians from Edinburgh
Anglo-Scots
Scottish Labour MPs
People associated with East Lothian
UK MPs 1974–1979
UK MPs 1979–1983
UK MPs 1983–1987
UK MPs 1987–1992
UK MPs 1992–1997
UK MPs 1997–2001
Labour MSPs
Members of the Scottish Parliament 1999–2003
Members of the Scottish Parliament 2003–2007
People educated at Ampleforth College
Alumni of Scotland's Rural College
Transport Salaried Staffs' Association-sponsored MPs